Steve Lawrence (born 1955) is a male retired British cyclist.

Cycling career
He represented England in the road race, at the 1978 Commonwealth Games in Edmonton, Alberta, Canada. Four years later he represented England in the road race and team time trial, at the 1982 Commonwealth Games in Brisbane, Queensland, Australia. He finished just outside the medals in fourth place in the road race but won a gold medal in the team time trial with Joseph Waugh, Malcolm Elliott and Bob Downs.

Lawrence was a two times National Champion in 1977 and 1980.

References

Living people
1955 births
British male cyclists
Commonwealth Games medallists in cycling
Commonwealth Games gold medallists for England
Cyclists at the 1982 Commonwealth Games
Medallists at the 1982 Commonwealth Games